Wang Bo (Chinese:王博, born January 23, 1985) is a Chinese professional footballer who plays as a midfielder.

Club career
Wang Bo would start his career playing for third tier football club  Nanchang Bayi Hengyuan in the 2005 Chinese league season and was part of the squad that won the division title. By the 2009 league season he would then be part of the team that came runner-up of the Chinese league One division and the team won promotion to the Chinese Super League for the first time. With the club he would aid them in their attempts to avoid relegation for the next several seasons until the team moved to Shanghai in 2012 and renamed themselves Shanghai Shenxin where Wang Bo would join them.

After spending much of the 2012 Chinese Super League season sitting on the bench for the second season running it was decided that Wang Bo should go on loan to recently promoted second tier club Hubei China-Kyle F.C. for the whole of the 2013 Chinese league season.

Career statistics

Statistics accurate as of match played 12 November 2014

Honours
China League Two: 2005

References

External links
CSL Player profile at Sina.com

1985 births
Living people
Chinese footballers
Footballers from Hubei
Shanghai Shenxin F.C. players
Xinjiang Tianshan Leopard F.C. players
Chinese Super League players
China League One players
Association football midfielders